Teng Shangkun (born 10 January 1991) is a Chinese footballer currently playing as a goalkeeper for Chinese club Tai'an Tiankuang.

Club career
Teng Shangkun would play for the Shandong Luneng youth team where he won the U15 football league championship in 2005 and 2006 as well as the U19 football league championship in 2009, which saw Zhejiang Greentown go on to sign him on 28 February 2010. He would be immediately promoted to their senior team at the start of the 2010 Chinese Super League season. On 7 July 2011 he was loaned to fellow Chinese Super League team Guangzhou R&F to gain some playing time. When Teng returned from his loan spell he was unable to gain any senior appearances and the new head coach Takeshi Okada decided that he was surplus to requirement. On 29 February 2012, Teng was loaned to second tier football club Chongqing for the 2012 China League One season. Teng would make his debut in a league game on 14 July 2012 against Guangdong Sunray Cave in a 1-0 victory due to the suspension of first choice goalkeeper Guo Wei.

On 28 February 2014 Teng joined second tier football club Qingdao Huanghai for the start of the 2014 China League One season. He would make his debut for them on 15 April 2014 in a Chinese FA Cup game against Dalianwan Qianguan that ended in a 3-2 victory. After three seasons with Qingdao, Teng joined top tier club Tianjin TEDA on a free transfer and would make his debut in a league game against Henan Jianye on 20 April 2019 where he came on as substitute for the injured Yang Qipeng in a game that ended in a 3-2 victory.

Career statistics

References

External links

1991 births
Living people
Chinese footballers
Association football goalkeepers
China League One players
Chinese Super League players
Zhejiang Professional F.C. players
Guangzhou City F.C. players
Qingdao F.C. players
Tianjin Jinmen Tiger F.C. players
Sportspeople from Qingdao